Gonnocondylus or Gonnocondylum, also called Olympias, was a town in ancient Thessaly. The town was renamed Olympias by Philip V of Macedon prior to 185 BCE, when the Perrhaebians requested the return of the town, along with Malloea and Ericinium.

Its site is located at Tsourba Mandra.

References

Populated places in ancient Thessaly
Former populated places in Greece
Perrhaebia